Little Ayton is a village and civil parish in Hambleton District of North Yorkshire, England and lies immediately south of Great Ayton.  The population of this civil parish taken at the 2011 Census was less than 100. Details are included in the civil parish of Easby, Hambleton.

Above the village within the civil parish on Easby Moor is Captain Cook's Monument, a stone obelisk.

References 

Villages in North Yorkshire
Civil parishes in North Yorkshire